Paul Barrere (July 3, 1948 – October 26, 2019) was an American musician most prominent as a member of the band Little Feat, which he joined in 1972 some three years after the band was created by Lowell George.

Career

Barrere recorded and performed with Taj Mahal, Jack Bruce, Chicken Legs, Blues Busters, Valerie Carter, Helen Watson, Chico Hamilton, Robert Palmer, Eikichi Yazawa, and Carly Simon.  He can be seen in the 1979 Nicolette Larson Warner Brothers promotional video of "Lotta Love".

Barrere's best known contributions to Little Feat as a songwriter include "Skin It Back", and "Feats Don't Fail Me Now" from the album Feats Don't Fail Me Now, "All That You Dream" from The Last Record Album, "Time Loves a Hero" from Time Loves a Hero, and "Down on the Farm" from Down on the Farm.

Barrere was a swing man as a guitarist who played a wide variety of styles of music including blues, rock, jazz, and cajun music and was proficient as a slide guitarist.

Barrere also recorded and toured as an acoustic duo with fellow Little Feat member Fred Tackett.

Barrere played several concerts with Phil Lesh and Friends in October 1999 and from March to June 2000.  He also toured with Bob Dylan, and had most recently been writing and recording with Roger Cole.

Personal life
Born on July 3, 1948 in Burbank, California, he was the son of the Hollywood actors Paul Bryar and Claudia Bryar. Barrere contracted Hepatitis C in 1994, but had managed to keep it under control. In 2015, he was diagnosed with liver cancer.

Paul Barrere died on October 26, 2019 at the age of 71 in Westwood, Los Angeles, California.

Discography

Solo
 1983 On My Own Two Feet (Mirage)
 1984 Real Lies (Atlantic)
 1995 If the Phone Don't Ring (Zoo)

Bluesbusters 
 1984 Merry Christmas (Tower)
 1986 Accept No Substitutes (Landslide)
 1987 This Time (Landslide)

Paul Barrere and Fred Tackett
2001 Live from North Cafe (Relix)
2009 Live in the UK 2008 (Stonehenge)

Collaborations
2013 Plays Well with Others - by Greg Koch - Tracks: 4,7,9,10

With Bonnie Raitt
 Takin' My Time (Columbia Records, 2013)

With Pat McGee
 Pat McGee (Pat McGee, 2015)

With Valerie Carter
 Just a Stone's Throw Away (Columbia Records, 1977)

With Robert Palmer
 Pressure Drop (Island Records, 1975)
 Some People Can Do What They Like (Island Records, 1976)
 Double Fun (Island Records, 1978)

With Sanne Salomonsen
 Language of the Heart (Virgin Records, 1994)

With Nicolette Larson
 Nicolette (Warner Bros. Records, 1978)
 In the Nick of Time (Warner Bros. Records, 1979)
 Radioland (Warner Bros. Records, 1981)

With Tom Johnston
 Everything You've Heard Is True (Warner Bros. Records, 1979)

With Taj Mahal
 Like Never Before (Private Music, 1991)

With Carly Simon
 Another Passenger (Elektra Records, 1976)

References

External links
Paul Barrere biography
 Complete sessionography at the official Little Feat website (archived 2012)

Paul Barrere and Fred Tackett Acoustic Duo collection at the Internet Archive's live music archive
 Band announcement of Barrere's death.

1948 births
2019 deaths
20th-century American guitarists
21st-century American guitarists
Musicians from Burbank, California
Slide guitarists
American rock guitarists
Little Feat members
Rhythm guitarists
American male singer-songwriters
American session musicians
American blues guitarists
American rhythm and blues guitarists
American rock songwriters
American rock singers
American funk guitarists
American male guitarists
Guitarists from California
Deaths from liver cancer
Deaths from cancer in California
Relix Records artists
Singer-songwriters from California